Eugen Schmitz (12 July 1882 – 10 July 1959) was a German musicologist and music critic.

Life 
Schmitz was born in Neuburg an der Donau. The descendant of the violin virtuoso, composer and court kapellmeister Louis Spohr first studied law, then music and musicology in Munich with Anton Beer-Walbrunn, Adolf Sandberger and Theodor Kroyer. There he published the article Zum hundertjährigen Geburtstag Franz Lachner's in the Münchener Zeitung already in 1903. He received his doctorate in 1905 and was a music critic for the Munich Allgemeine Zeitung. After a study stay in Italy, he worked as a private lecturer in Munich from 1909, where he  habilitated in musicology in 1910, and from 1914 to 1915 he was director of the Salzburg Mozarteum. In 1915 he went to Dresden, was music editor of the Dresdner Nachrichten until 1939 and taught as a lecturer of musicology from 1916, and from 1918 as professor at the Technische Universität Dresden. Schmitz was NSDAP member No. 2.442.825 and in November 1933 signed the Vow of allegiance of the Professors of the German Universities and High-Schools to Adolf Hitler and the National Socialistic State. He wrote for the Dresdner Nachrichten and the Nazi journal .

Schmitz died in Leipzig at age 76.

Writings 
chronological
 Zum hundertjährigen Geburtstag Franz Lachner’s. Münchener Zeitung dated 2 April 1903
 Hugo Wolf (Musiker-Biographien Band 26/Universal-Bibliothek Nr. 4853), Leipzig 1906
 Richard Strauss als Musikdramatiker. Eine ästhetisch-kritische Studie. Munich 1907
 Richard Wagner. (Wissenschaft und Bildung Band 55), Leipzig 1909, 1918
 Harmonielehre als Theorie, Aesthetik und Geschichte der musikalischen Harmonik (Sammlung Kösel Band 49), Kempten/Munich 1911, 1917
 Giovanni Pierluigi da Palestrina.  (Breitkopf & Härtels Musikbücher / Kleine Musikerbiographien), Leipzig 1914
 Orlando di Lasso (Breitkopf & Härtels Musikbücher / Kleine Musikerbiographien), Leipzig 1915
 Musikästhetik. (Handbuch der Musiklehre. XIII), 1915
 Schuberts Auswirkung auf die deutsche Musik bis zu Hugo Wolf und Bruckner. Leipzig 1954
 Orlando di Lasso, Leipzig 1954
 Giovanni Pierluigi Palestrina, Leipzig 1954
 Das mächtige Häuflein (Musikbücherei für jedermann Nr. 4), Leipzig 1955
 Unverwelkter Volksliedstil. J. A. P. Schulz und seine „Lieder im Volkston“, Leipzig 1956.

References

External links 
 

German male journalists
20th-century German musicologists
Academic staff of TU Dresden
Academic staff of the Ludwig Maximilian University of Munich
German music critics
Nazi Party members
1882 births
1959 deaths
People from Neuburg an der Donau